The J.A. Woollam Company is a manufacturer of spectroscopic ellipsometers headquartered in Lincoln, Nebraska.

Background

The J.A. Woollam Company was founded in 1987 by Dr. John A. Woollam. Starting as a spin-off from the University of Nebraska–Lincoln, the J.A. Woollam Company has specialized in the manufacture and sale of spectroscopic ellipsometry equipment. The company employs over 50 people, the majority of whom are engineers and scientists dedicated to the research in ellipsometry measurement. All equipment is hand-assembled.

The J.A. Woollam Company is located in Lincoln, Nebraska, in the historic Haymarket area. In July 2022, the company began expansion of its historic building known as the Cotswold Building. The J.A. Woollam Company plans to double its size by adding a three-story addition to the west side of the Cotswold Building.

External links
 J.A. Woollam homepage

References

Companies based in Lincoln, Nebraska
Companies established in 1987
Equipment semiconductor companies
Laboratory equipment manufacturers